Aleksandr Apollonovich Shavlokhov (born in 1939 in Tskhinvali, South Ossetian Autonomous Oblast, Georgian SSR, Soviet Union) is a South Ossetian politician and former Prime Minister, from 1996 until August 1998.

Shavlokhov was educated as a mechanical engineer in Moscow. From 1965 until 1974, he worked at the "Elektrovibromashina" factory in Tskhinvali, where he was appointed director in 1973. From 1974 until 1981, he headed the executive committee of the Tskhinvali City Council.

In 1996, after Lyudvig Chibirov had been elected as South Ossetia's first president, Shavlokhov became Chibirov's prime minister. During his time as PM, foreign contacts of South Ossetia were intensified, and programs were adopted to deepen the integration of North and South Ossetia.

References

1939 births
Living people
Prime Ministers of South Ossetia
People from Tskhinvali